Shahin (also Romanized as Shāhīn; also known as Shāhī) is a village in Holayjan Rural District, in the Central District of Izeh County, Khuzestan Province, Iran. At the 2006 census, its population was 151, in 22 families.

References 

Populated places in Izeh County